1898 in Argentine football saw Lomas win its 5th Primera División championship within 6 seasons. The runner-up was Lobos. Flores and Belgrano A.C. "B" left the championship, being replaced by Lobos which returned to the Association.

A new team, United Banks, debuted in the league.

Primera división

Final standings

Championship playoff
Lomas and Lobos finished first with 20 points each so they had to play a match to define a champion. After the first game was declared null by the Association attending to a request by Lobos, a second match was played, winning Lomas the title.

References

 
Seasons in Argentine football
1898 in South American football